Malaysia participated in the 2018 Asian Games in Jakarta and Palembang, Indonesia from 18 August to 2 September 2018. At the last edition in Incheon, the country placed 14 in the medals tally, with 5 gold medals from squash, sailing, and karate. In 2018 edition, Malaysia was represented by 447 athletes and 140 officials at the Games. Abdul Azim Mohamad Zabidi, the Appeals Committee chairman of the Olympic Council of Malaysia was the chief of the delegation.

Media coverage 
Malaysian satellite television provider Astro and public broadcaster Radio Televisyen Malaysia (RTM) held the broadcast rights of the 2018 Asian Games in the country. Astro broadcast the games live on 12 Astro SuperSport channels, 4 Astro Arena channels, as well as Astro GO and NJOI Now mobile applications. Astro was also one of the production teams for host broadcaster International Games Broadcast Services.

Radio Televisyen Malaysia broadcast the games live on 3 television channels, TV1, TV2 and RTM HD Sports (now Sukan RTM) and its over-the-top media service website, myklik (now RTMklik). This marked the return of the broadcast department to cover the games after 8 years, having previously replaced by Media Prima broadcast companies: TV3 and TV9 for the coverage of the 2014 edition.

Medalists 

The following Malaysian competitors won medals at the Games.

|  style="text-align:left; width:78%; vertical-align:top;" |

|  style="text-align:left; width:22%; vertical-align:top;" |

Multiple medallists
The following Malaysia competitors won several medals at the 2018 Asian Games.

Competitors 
The following is a list of the number of competitors representing Malaysia that had participated at the Asian Games:

Archery

Recurve

Compound

Artistic swimming

Athletics

Men

Women

Badminton 

OCM announced the Malaysia badminton squad of 14 players (10 men's and 4 women's). On Saturday, 30 June 2018, the Badminton Association of Malaysia (BAM) dropped Iskandar Zulkarnain Zainuddin from the squad due to smoking and disciplinary issues, but because Lee Chong Wei withdrew from the competition, he will be considered again by BAM. BAM finally decide the 2018 World Championships bronze medalist Liew Daren to replace Lee Chong Wei, while Soong Joo Ven replace Iskandar to join the squad.

Men

Women

Mixed

Basketball 

Malaysia didn`t join at the 5x5 basketball event and joined 3x3 basketball event.

Summary

Men's 3x3 Tournament 

Roster
Wong Yi Hou
Heng Yee Tong
Ting Chun Hong
Liew Wen Qian

Group D

Women's 3x3 Tournament 

Roster
Ho Ching Yee
Wong Sze Qian
Hiew Ky Lie
Ng Yu Feng

Group A

Quarter-finals

Beach volleyball

Bowling

Men

Women

Boxing

Canoeing

Kayak Slalom

Men

Women

Kayak Sprint

Men

Women

Canoe polo (demonstration) 
For the first time in Asian Games history, canoe polo contested as demonstration sport, meaning medals won in this sport will not be counted in the official overall medal tally.

Contract bridge

Men

Supermixed

Cycling

BMX

Road

Track

Men

Women

Diving

Men

Women

Equestrian

Dressage

Jumping

eSports (demonstration) 

eSports is being featured at the 2018 Asian Games as a demonstration sport, meaning medals won in this sport will not be counted in the official overall medal tally. eSports will be a medal event at the 2022 Asian Games.It is being held from 26 August to 1 September 2018.Six video game titles are being featured in the demonstration event.

Field hockey 

Malaysia men's team competed at the Games in pool B, while the women's team in pool A.

Summary

Men's tournament 

Roster

Pool B

Semifinal

Gold medal game

Women's tournament 

Roster

Pool A

Fifth place game

Fencing

Men

Women

Football 

Malaysia joined in the group E at the men's football event.

Summary

Men's tournament 

Roster

Group E

Round of 16

Golf

Gymnastic

Artistic 
Team Final & Individual Qualification

Men

Women

Rhythmic

Team Final and Individual Qualification

Handball 

Malaysia men's team will compete at the Games in group A, while the women's team in group B. It was the first time in Asian Games history Malaysia compete in the sport.

Summary

Men's tournament 

Roster

 Najhan Bohari
 Mohammad Izzat Muhammad Abdul Karim
 Dzulfiqar Ismail
 Nabil Abdul Razak
 Fazrin Jamaluddin
 Ammar Safwan Nadzarudin
 Koh Chan Seng
 Faizan Damanhuri
 Ridzuan Mohd Razali
 Salman Sayyidi Hamzah
 Mohd Uzair Zubli
 Khairul Amirul Abdullah
 Ahmad Zaidi Rosdi
 Solihin Mustafa Kamal
 Amirul Ikram Abdul Razak
 Fikree Azman

Group A

Classification round (9–13)

Women's tournament 

Roster

 Nurul Hafizah Mispani
 Norsyamimi Wan Mohd Nazri
 Nur Alia Saimi
 Nur Shaidatul Mohd Zubaidi
 Noor Haninah Hasri
 Nur Amira Wahid
 Farah Atifah Ahmad Yusop
 Aqilah Hasya Haris Fadzillah
 Nurul irdina Yazid
 Dharshiniy N Sivan
 Nurfarahiyah Yusri
 Siti Zubaidah Mohd Salleh
 Nor Shuhada Zahari
 Nur Atikah Azman
 Nurshahira Abd Rahman
 Nur Asyiqin Rasdi

Group B

Ninth place game

Jetski

Mixed

Judo 

Malaysia will compete at the Games with one judoka.

Men

Kabaddi

Summary

Men's tournament

Team roster

Prabhakaran Mani
Dinesh Tamilselvam
Allexson Lian Sin
Ganga Tharen Thana Seelan
Thanaselan Nadarajan
Tavitaran Nedunjilan
Vimalanathan Pavadai
Devan Munisvaran
Prabakaran Maksvaran
Dinishwaran Markandan
Logean Ravindran
Sasikumar Manimaran

Group B

Karate

Men

Women

Paragliding

Accuracy

Cross-Country

Pencak Silat

Men

Women

Roller sports

Skateboarding

Speed skating

Rowing

Rugby sevens 

Malaysia men's team has been placed in group B at the Games.

Men's tournament 

Squad
The following is the Malaysia squad in the men's rugby sevens tournament of the 2018 Asian Games.

Head coach: Mohd Saizul Hafifi Md Noor

 Mohamad Safwan Abdullah
 Zulkiflee Azmi
 Muhammad Nasharuddin Ismail
 Wan Izzuddin Ismail
 Muhammad Siddiq Amir Jalil
 Muhammad Azwan Zuwairi Mat Zizi
 Muhammad Dzafran Asyraaf Muhamad Zainudin
 Amalul Hazim Nasarrudin
 Mohamad Khairul Abdillah Ramli
 Muhammad Zulhisham Rasli
 Muhamad Firdaus Tarmizi
 Muhammad Ameer Nasrun Zulkeffli

Group B

Quarterfinal

Classification semifinal (5–8)

Fifth place game

Sambo

Men

Sailing

Sepak takraw 

Men

Women

Shooting

Men

Women

Mixed

Sport climbing 

Speed

Speed relay

Combined

Squash 

Individual

Men's team 

Pool B

Semifinals

Gold medal match

Women's team 

Pool A

Semifinals

Swimming

Men

Women

Table Tennis

Men

Women

Mixed

Team

Taekwondo 

Poomsae

Kyorugi

Triathlon

Individual

Mixed relay

Wushu 

Taolu

See also
 Malaysia at the 2018 Asian Para Games

References 

Nations at the 2018 Asian Games
2018
Asian Games